Tony Pesznecker (born February 11, 1958) is a former Canadian professional soccer player.

Pesznecker played professionally for both the Minnesota Kicks of the North American Soccer League and the Minnesota Thunder of the USL.  He also played for the Edmonton Eagles and Edmonton Brick Men in professional outdoor leagues and Wichita Wings and Memphis Storm in professional indoor leagues.  Pesznecker was inducted into the Thunder Hall of Fame in 1996.  Currently, he is the girls soccer coach at Wayzata High School in Wayzata, Minnesota, where he was named one of the National Soccer Coaches Association of America coaches of the year in 2003 and recently got his 500th win.

References

External links
 NASL/MISL Stats

1958 births
Living people
Soccer players from Calgary
American Indoor Soccer Association players
Canadian expatriate sportspeople in the United States
Canadian expatriate soccer players
Canadian Professional Soccer League (original) players
Canadian soccer players
Edmonton Brick Men players
Edmonton Eagles players
Association football defenders
Major Indoor Soccer League (1978–1992) players
Memphis Storm players
Midwestern State University alumni
Minnesota Thunder players
Minnesota Kicks players
North American Soccer League (1968–1984) players
USISL players
Wichita Wings (MISL) players
Midwestern State Mustangs men's soccer players